The Dagomys is a river in the Caucasus that flows into the Black Sea. It has two tributaries; on the left is the Western Dagomys, and on the right is the Eastern Dagomys. The river flows through the City of Sochi.

References

Sochi
Rivers of Krasnodar Krai
Tributaries of the Black Sea